Kripplebush Historic District is a national historic district located at Marbletown in Ulster County, New York.  The district includes 33 contributing buildings. It encompasses a variety of stone and frame dwellings and outbuildings at the hamlet of Kripplebush. Many of these buildings created a once-functioning commercial area but the stores have been converted to residential use, the one room schoolhouse is now a museum; only the Methodist Church, built in 1857, continues in its original function. Older maps refer to the district as Kripple Bush.

It was listed on the National Register of Historic Places in 1994.

Gallery

External links
 at LivingPlaces.com, seemingly the text of the historic district nomination for the Kripplebush Historic District

References

National Register of Historic Places in Ulster County, New York
Historic districts on the National Register of Historic Places in New York (state)
Federal architecture in New York (state)
Historic districts in Ulster County, New York